Serovsky (masculine), Serovskaya (feminine), or Serovskoye (neuter) is the name of several rural localities in Ryazan Oblast, Russia:
Serovskoye, Ryazansky District, Ryazan Oblast, a village in Semenovsky Rural Okrug of Ryazansky District
Serovskoye, Sasovsky District, Ryazan Oblast, a village in Malostudenetsky Rural Okrug of Sasovsky District